"Round & Round" is the lead single released by the Twinz from their debut album, Conversation. Produced by Warren G, "Round & Round" became the most successful single the Twinz would release during their brief existence, making to four different Billboard charts, including 84 on the Billboard Hot 100. R&B singer Nanci Fletcher is featured on the song.

Single track listing
"Round & Round" (Radio Edit)- 3:42  
"Round & Round" (LP Version)- 3:42  
"Round & Round" (Instrumental)- 3:42  
"4 Eyes 2 Heads" (LP Version)- 3:20

Charts

References 

1995 debut singles
Twinz songs
1995 songs
Def Jam Recordings singles